The 2012 Judo Grand Slam Paris was held in Paris, France, from 4 to 5 February 2012.

Medal summary

Men's events

Women's events

Source Results

Medal table

References

External links
 

2012 IJF World Tour
2012 Judo Grand Slam
Judo
Grand Slam Paris 2012
Judo
Judo